Clifton House is a grade I listed building in King's Lynn, in Norfolk, England. A house has stood on the site since the 13th century. The current facade was constructed in 1708.

External links 
 Clifton House at Norfolk Heritage Explorer
 Clifton House at Historic England

Grade I listed buildings in Norfolk
King's Lynn